Aḥmad Khwājagī b. Jalāl ad-Dīn al-Kāsānī (died 1542–43), revered as the Makhdūm-i Aʿẓam ('Greatest Teacher'), was a Ṣūfī saint of the Naqshbandiyya. He was born in the Farghāna valley and became a disciple of Khwāja Aḥrār in Tāshkand. He created a Ṣūfī hostel in Bukhārā and died in his estate in Dahbīd. His descendants dominated the history of Eastern Turkistān in the 17th–18th centuries. Among them was Āfāq Khwāja, who preached in Kāshghar.

References

 
 

1540s deaths
Year of birth unknown
Year of death uncertain
Sufi saints

Naqshbandi order